William Langhorne (born July 29, 1974, in Washington, D.C.), is a race car driver sponsored by Porsche. He is also a former driver in the Indy Racing League. After coming up through karting and the Skip Barber Racing Schools, he drove in the Barber Dodge Pro Series from 1997 to 1999 and Toyota Atlantic in 1999 and 2000. He reached his goal of top-level open-wheel racing when he competed in the 2002 IRL season with 3 starts for Treadway Racing.  His best career IRL finish was in 13th position in the Delphi Indy 300 at the Chicagoland Speedway.  In 2003, he raced in Formula 3000 for BCN Competicion.
In 2004 and 2005 he raced in the ARCA ReMax Series. In 2006 he raced for Molitor Racing in the Porsche Michelin Supercup Series that tours with Formula One.

He is an alumnus of Burke Mountain Academy and Babson College.

Racing record

American Open Wheel
(key)

Indy Racing League

Complete Porsche Supercup results
(key) (Races in bold indicate pole position) (Races in italics indicate fastest lap)

Complete International Formula 3000 results
(key) (Races in bold indicate pole position; races in italics indicate fastest lap.)

ARCA Re/Max Series
(key) (Bold – Pole position awarded by qualifying time. Italics – Pole position earned by points standings or practice time. * – Most laps led.)

External links

 

1974 births
Living people
IndyCar Series drivers
Atlantic Championship drivers
Babson College alumni
International Formula 3000 drivers
Porsche Supercup drivers
ARCA Menards Series drivers
Racing drivers from Washington, D.C.
Barber Pro Series drivers